"The Beat Goes On" is a song by English rock band Beady Eye. Featured on their debut album Different Gear, Still Speeding, it was the third official single released from the album, released on 15 July 2011. They performed the single on Alan Carr: Chatty Man, on 1 July 2011.

Track listing
All songs written by Liam Gallagher, Gem Archer, and Andy Bell
"The Beat Goes On" – 4:44
"In the Bubble with a Bullet" – 2:57

Chart performance

Music video
A promotional music video was filmed at the Isle Of Wight festival 2011 and released shortly after.

Release history

References

2011 singles
Beady Eye songs
Songs written by Liam Gallagher
Songs written by Gem Archer
Song recordings produced by Steve Lillywhite
Songs written by Andy Bell (musician)
Song recordings produced by Liam Gallagher
Song recordings produced by Gem Archer
Song recordings produced by Andy Bell (musician)